Rusty Lance is a single released by Japanese pop and folk musician Akeboshi. Sony Music Entertainment Japan released the single on October 19, 2005.

Track listing

Personnel
 – guitar, vocals, piano

References

2005 singles
2005 songs